Adrianus Theodorus (Adri) Duivesteijn (27 August 195017 March 2023) was a Dutch politician from the Labour Party. He served as a member of the House of Representatives and the Senate.

Duivesteijn died from prostate cancer on 17 March 2023, at the age of 72.

References 

1950 births
2023 deaths
Labour Party (Netherlands) politicians
Members of the House of Representatives (Netherlands)
Members of the Senate (Netherlands)
20th-century Dutch politicians
21st-century Dutch politicians
Deaths from prostate cancer